Alan Michael Zinter (born May 19, 1968) is an American former professional baseball player and hitting coach. He played for Seibu Lions of Nippon Professional Baseball (NPB) in 1999 and with the Houston Astros and Arizona Diamondbacks of Major League Baseball (MLB) in 2002 and 2004, respectively. He served as the minor league hitting coordinator for the Cleveland Indians, the assistant hitting coach for the Astros, and was the hitting coach of the San Diego Padres and Cincinnati Reds.

Career

Playing career
Zinter played for the Arizona Wildcats baseball team, and in 1988 he played collegiate summer baseball with the Harwich Mariners of the Cape Cod Baseball League. He was a 1st round draft choice (24th overall) by the New York Mets in 1989 as a catcher, but eventually moved to first base. He played in the minors for fourteen years, including one season in the Dominican winter league for the Cibao Giants in 1996 and one season in Japan for the Seibu Lions in 1999, before finally getting a call-up with the Houston Astros in 2002. His first hit was a home run off Scott Williamson and he batted .136 (6 for 44). In 2004, he earned another call-up with the Arizona Diamondbacks, doing slightly better hitting .206 (7 for 34).

Zinter played in 2006 with the Round Rock Express, the Triple-A affiliate of the Houston Astros, but mostly as a pinch hitter and a defensive replacement. In 2007, Zinter played for the Somerset Patriots of the independent Atlantic League.

Coaching career
In 2008, Zinter began his coaching career with the Rookie level Missoula Osprey in the Diamondbacks organization. On December 2, 2008, Zinter was announced as the hitting coach for the High-A Visalia Rawhide. After two seasons with Visalia, he was moved up to Double-A to be the hitting coach of the Mobile BayBears. He was hired by the Indians to be their minor league hitting coordinator for the 2012 season.

On November 4, 2014, Zinter was announced as the new assistant hitting coach for the Houston Astros by general manager Jeff Luhnow. After the 2015 season, the San Diego Padres hired Zinter as their hitting coach. On September 1, 2017, Zinter was fired by the Padres. In 2018 and 2019, Zinter worked as the San Francisco Giants Assistant Director of Player Development, Offense. On October 24, 2019, the Cincinnati Reds announced the hiring of Zinter as their hitting coach. On October 6, 2022, the Reds announced that Zinter would not return for the 2023 season.

Personal life
Zinter is married to Yvonne.

References

External links

1968 births
Living people
Major League Baseball first basemen
Houston Astros players
Arizona Diamondbacks players
Houston Astros coaches
San Diego Padres coaches
Major League Baseball hitting coaches
Seibu Lions players
Pittsfield Mets players
St. Lucie Mets players
Jackson Mets players
Williamsport Bills players
Binghamton Mets players
Toledo Mud Hens players
Pawtucket Red Sox players
Tacoma Rainiers players
Iowa Cubs players
Tucson Sidewinders players
New Orleans Zephyrs players
Round Rock Express players
Somerset Patriots players
Arizona Wildcats baseball players
Harwich Mariners players
American expatriate baseball players in Japan
Nippon Professional Baseball first basemen
Minor league baseball coaches
Baseball players from Texas
Sportspeople from El Paso, Texas
All-American college baseball players
Mat-Su Miners players